William Danforth Mulliken (August 27, 1939 – July 17, 2014) was an American competition swimmer and Olympic champion.

Mulliken represented the United States at the 1959 Pan American Games, where he won the 200-meter breaststroke, his signature event.  At the 1960 Summer Olympics in Rome, he received a gold medal for winning the men's 200-meter breaststroke with a time of 2:37.4.

He graduated from Miami University in 1961 with a bachelor's degree, and Harvard University in 1964 with a law degree.

He founded Big Shoulders, a swim event at Ohio Street Beach in 1991 and held annually since.  An avid reader, he was an active member, supporter and leader of the Caxton Club of Chicago.  He also chaired the capital campaign for Miami University's Library.

His first marriage was to Julia N. Neavolls.  They had two daughters and a son before the marriage ended in divorce.  He later married  Lorna Filippini.

See also
 List of members of the International Swimming Hall of Fame
 List of Miami University people
 List of Olympic medalists in swimming (men)

References

External links
 
  Bill Mulliken (USA) – Honor Swimmer profile at International Swimming Hall of Fame

1939 births
2014 deaths
American male breaststroke swimmers
Harvard Law School alumni
Miami RedHawks men's swimmers
Olympic gold medalists for the United States in swimming
People from Urbana, Illinois
Swimmers at the 1959 Pan American Games
Swimmers at the 1960 Summer Olympics
Medalists at the 1960 Summer Olympics
Pan American Games gold medalists for the United States
Pan American Games medalists in swimming
Medalists at the 1959 Pan American Games